Asín de Broto is a locality located in the municipality of Broto, in Huesca province, Aragon, Spain. As of 2020, it has a population of 28.

Geography 
Asín de Broto is located 78km north-northeast of Huesca.

References

Populated places in the Province of Huesca